In genetics, Rs1805054, also called C267T, is a name used for a specific genetic variation, a single nucleotide polymorphism (SNP), in the HTR6 gene.
It is one of the few investigated polymorphisms of its gene.
C267T is a synonymous polymorphism.

As of 2008 meta-analysis of the polymorphism and Alzheimer's disease indicates that there probably is no association between the two,
though individual studies report such an association, e.g., a Chinese study found an association with late-onset Alzheimer's disease.
Another reported association in neuropsychiatry disorders is with treatment response in depression.

C267T has also been examined in relation to personality traits, with a Korean study finding some evidence for an association with the trait self-transcendence.
A Japanese study reported no association with personality traits using the NEO PI-R personality inventory.

References 

SNPs on chromosome 1